Deimantas is a Lithuanian masculine given name. The feminine form of the Deimantas is Deimantė. People bearing the name Deimantas include:
Deimantas Bička (born 1972), Lithuanian footballer
Deimantas Narkevičius (born 1964), Lithuanian sculptor and artist 
Deimantas Petravičius (born 1995), Lithuanian footballer

Lithuanian masculine given names